The reed vole (Microtus fortis) is a species of vole.  It is found in northern and central Eurasia, including northern China and the Korean Peninsula.  This species is somewhat larger and longer-tailed than most other voles.

Description
The reed vole is one of the largest voles in the genus Microtus. The fur on the back is dark tawny-brown and the flanks are buffish brown, blending gradually into the greyish underparts. The upper side of the feet are light brown and the tail is bicoloured, the upper side being dark brown and the underside whitish.

Distribution
The reed vole is native to eastern Asia. Its range includes the Trans-Baikal region of Russia, the Amur River Basin, northeastern Mongolia, eastern China and North and South Korea. Its typical habitat is steppe and forest steppe where it is found near lakes and watercourses, among coarse vegetation and in wet meadows and marshes.

Behaviour
The reed vole is active both by day and night. It moves rather slowly on land but is an excellent swimmer. In particularly wet environments the burrows may be shallow or mere ruts on the surface of the ground. In the spring and summer, reed voles mainly eat shoots and leaves, as well as the stems of grasses. In the autumn they gather grain and pieces of grass and store them in their burrows and at this time of year they also feed on bark, roots and the pith of reeds but leaves seem to be their favourite food.

Breeding takes place between April and November. In favourable conditions there may be six litters during the season, each consisting of about five offspring. The gestation period is about twenty days with females becoming sexually mature by about four months and males at a slightly older age.

Status
The reed vole is a common species over much of its wide range and no particular threats have been identified, so the International Union for Conservation of Nature has assessed its conservation status as being of "least concern".

References

Mammals of Asia
Microtus
Mammals described in 1889